Ricardo Larraín (27 April 1957 – 21 March 2016) was a Chilean film editor and director. His 1991 film The Frontier won the Silver Bear for an outstanding single achievement at the 42nd Berlin International Film Festival.

Larraín died of lymphoma in March 2016.

Selected filmography
 La frontera (1991)
 El entusiasmo (1998)
 Chile puede (2008)
 El niño rojo, la película (2014)

References

External links

1957 births
2016 deaths
Chilean film directors
Chilean film editors
Deaths from cancer in Chile
Deaths from lymphoma
Chilean people of Basque descent